Marvel 1602: Fantastick Four is a five-issue comic book limited series published by Marvel Comics in 2006. It was the second sequel to the successful Marvel 1602 series, the other sequels being 1602: New World and Spider-Man: 1602. It is written by Peter David and pencilled by Pascal Alixe.

Plot
The story involves the Four of the Fantastick's adventures in London, the return of Otto Von Doom and the Four Who Are Frightful. Doom hires the Four Who Are Frightful, a group of four villains who claim to have "toppled over the end of the world and found a lost city there." Doom kidnaps William Shakespeare because he wants him to document the voyage to the "end of the world." Doom thinks the inhabitants of the city will be able to repair the damage to his face that he received in Marvel 1602. The villains and Shakespeare use a boat held up by a giant balloon. The Fantastick Four, alerted by Benjamin Grimm, who was working as an actor in Shakespeare's company, follow in hot pursuit on a super fast ship created by the leader of the four, Sir Richard Reed. During the voyage it is revealed that Jonathan Storm, another member of the four, kidnapped a young woman named Doris Evans and brought her on the ship to save her from a loveless marriage.

After a sea battle, all the characters end up in one boat and arrive in the city beyond the end of the world, Bensaylum. There, Susan Storm attracts the attention of the emperor Numenor, while his cousin, Rita is attracted to John Storm (much to Doris Evans's disapproval).

Numenor plots with Von Doom to deliver the siblings to him while disposing of Sir Richard and Captain Grimm. However, things do not go well, as the Four who are Frightful's leader Wizard, Doom, and Numenor all struggle to gain control of the population. Wizard steals Numernor's trident, and uses it to lift the city of Bensaylum into the air. Wizard, Doom, and Numenor fight, and Numenor is stabbed with his own trident. Before he dies, Numenor explains that if any royal blood is spilled on to the trident, then the city will vanish forever. The island in the air starts to crumble, and the people of Bensaylum start to fall to the waters below. In all the confusion, The Four Who Are Frightful member Medusa has her eye coverings ripped off and Wizard looks at her, turning to stone. The other two Four Who Are Frightful members, Sandman and the Trapster, are crushed by a large stone. The Fantastick Four decide they should save all they can and return to the ship and get away fast. With help from Johnny and Reed, Susan, Shakespeare, and Doris are brought back. They leave, just barely making it before the island crumbles away, taking all the people of Bensaylum plus Medusa and Doom with it. Everyone on the ship sails away.

There is an epilogue in which John and Doris's ex-husband-to-be find common ground and become friends. Sue, Reed, and Grimm talk about what happened and how Doris has joined Shakespeare, leaving John sad and suffering nightmares of Rita's apparent demise in which he was unable to save her. The story ends with Rita, clinging to a piece of driftwood, crying for help. The view expands out to show Uatu the Watcher watching over the Earth as he holds the planet in his hand.

Characters

Historic characters
 William Shakespeare - Ben works in his company as an actor, but he is kidnapped by Otto Von Doom while working on the script for Macbeth.
 James VI of Scotland and I of England - At the beginning of the story, the king watches an early production of Shakespeare's Macbeth. King James puts in a few "suggestions", such as seeing Macbeth as too nice of a character and wants him to be more evil.

Heroes
The Fantastick Four:
 Sir Richard Reed - A brilliant scientist who is able to stretch his body great distances.
 Susan Storm - the pregnant lover of Reed. She is perpetually invisible, so the reader can see the baby taking shape inside of her. After creating an invisible shield around the ship, however, she became visible again until the very end.
 John Storm - Susan's younger brother. Rash and reckless, John kidnapped an engaged woman named Doris and brought her aboard the Fantastick Four's ship just before it set sail. He loves her, but since she is not marrying him, he feels he is "saving" her from a bad life. He is able to turn into flame and fly.
 Ben Grimm - very close friend of Reed. Once a sea captain, Grimm has super strength and a rocky hide. He alerted the other three of the problem because he was working as an actor in Shakespeare's company when Shakespeare was kidnapped by Doom.

Villains
 Count Otto Von Doom - Ruler of Latveria. His face is horribly scarred, and he thinks the lost city at the end of the world will help him heal it.
 Natasha - A faithful servant and lover to Doom. Journeys with him, but when she starts to lose faith in him and his orders, he shoves her off his floating ship to her death.
 Four who are Frightful:
 The Wizard - A very intelligent leader of the four, with some unexplained means of defying gravity.
 Medusa - The wife of the Wizard, has snakes for hair and can turn anyone to stone who looks at her eyes, thus must keep them covered at all times.
 Sandman - An albino named Marko who can summon nightmares and slumber at will.
 Trapster - An expert hunter.

Bensaylum
 Numenor - Lord Mariner, and emperor of the mythic realm of Bensaylum. Is in love with Susan, and wants Sir Reed killed so he can have her.
 Rita - Cousin to Numenor, and is in love with John Storm. Helps out the Four once they meet her.

Other
 Doris Evans - A woman who is loved by John, but is set to marry someone else. John steals her and takes her onto the ship. At first has no respect for John, but that changes after she gets to know him.

Collected editions
The Marvel 1602: Fantastick Four mini-series was collected as a trade paperback, published in June 2007.

References

2006 comics debuts